9963 Sandage, provisional designation , is a stony Phocaea asteroid from the inner regions of the asteroid belt, approximately 6 kilometers in diameter.

It was discovered by American astronomer Eleanor Helin at the Palomar Observatory in California on 9 January 1992, and later named after American astronomer Allan Sandage.

Orbit and classification 

Sandage is a stony member of the Phocaea family, a group of asteroids with similar orbital characteristics. It orbits the Sun in the inner main-belt at a distance of 1.7–3.0 AU once every 3 years and 7 months (1,308 days). Its orbit has an eccentricity of 0.28 and an inclination of 23° with respect to the ecliptic.

Physical characteristics

Rotation period 

Two rotational lightcurves of Sandage were obtained from photometric observations at the Palomar Transient Factory and at Texas Tech's Preston Gott Observatory in November 2011 and June 2016, respectively. Lightcurve analysis gave a rotation period of 4.65 hours with a high brightness variation of 0.56 and 0.43 in magnitude, respectively.

Diameter and albedo 

According to the survey carried out by the NEOWISE mission of NASA's Wide-field Infrared Survey Explorer, Sandage measures 6.4 kilometers in diameter and its surface has an albedo of 0.16, while the Collaborative Asteroid Lightcurve Link assumes an albedo of 0.23 – derived from the family's largest member and namesake, 25 Phocaea – and calculates a diameter of 5.5 kilometers with an absolute magnitude of 13.53.

Naming 

This minor planet was named after American astronomer Allan Sandage (1926–2010), a worldwide known expert on stellar astronomy and observational cosmology, who worked at Palomar and Mount Wilson Observatory. Sandage determined the first reasonably accurate values for the Hubble constant and also discovered the first quasar. The official naming citation was published by the Minor Planet Center on 2 September 2001.

References

External links 
 Asteroid Lightcurve Database (LCDB), query form (info )
 Dictionary of Minor Planet Names, Google books
 Asteroids and comets rotation curves, CdR – Observatoire de Genève, Raoul Behrend
 Discovery Circumstances: Numbered Minor Planets (5001)-(10000) – Minor Planet Center
 
 

009963
Discoveries by Eleanor F. Helin
Named minor planets
19920109